Sean-Michael Stephen (born 27 October 1982) is a Canadian rugby union player. From 2006 to 2008, Stephen played for French club AS Béziers Hérault. Since 2008, he has played for and currently captains Plymouth Albion in the Aviva Championship.

Stephen made his Canadian national team debut against the United States in 2005. He played for Canada at the 2007 Rugby World Cup.

References

1982 births
Rugby union flankers
Canadian rugby union players
Sportspeople from Ontario
Living people
Canada international rugby union players
Plymouth Albion R.F.C. players